Fatoumata Koné (born September 7, 1988) is an Ivorian female professional basketball player. She played on the 2013 Ivory Coast women's national basketball team.

References

External links
Profile at afrobasket.com

1988 births
Living people
Sportspeople from Abidjan
Ivorian women's basketball players
Point guards
Shooting guards